Que Pena Me Da may refer to:

"Que Pena Me Da", a song by Amarfis
"Que Pena Me Da", a song by Andy Montañez
"Que Pena Me Da", a song by Beny Moré
"Que Pena Me Da", a song by Jesse & Joy from Un Besito Más
"Que Pena Me Da", a song by Marco Antonio Muñiz
"Que Pena Me Da", a song by Machito
"Que Pena Me Da", a song by Oscar D'León
"Que Pena Me Da", a song by Pandora (band)
"Que Pena Me Da", a song  by Tito Rodríguez